Roseivirga ehrenbergii is a Gram-negative, heterotrophic, strictly aerobic and non-motile bacterium from the genus of Roseivirga which has been isolated from the green alga Ulva fenestrata from the Sea of Japan.

References

External links 
Type strain of Roseivirga ehrenbergii at BacDive -  the Bacterial Diversity Metadatabase

Cytophagia
Bacteria described in 2005